Leave This Town is the second album by the American rock band Daughtry, released on July 14, 2009, by RCA Records and 19 Entertainment. It is the first album that they recorded as a band, as their self-titled debut album was recorded before the band was formed and only lead singer Chris Daughtry was signed to the label. It was also their last album to feature Joey Barnes on drums. The album's style is primarily arena rock, with influences ranging from hard rock to pop rock.

Three singles were released from the album, led by "No Surprise", which became the group's fourth chart topper on the Billboard Adult Top 40 chart in August 2009. All three peaked within the top 40 on the Billboard Hot 100 and within the top five on both the Adult Top 40 and Adult Contemporary charts.

The album was released to generally mixed reviews, with critics noting the lack of progression from their previous album. It fared better commercially, debuting atop the Billboard 200 and selling over 1.3 Million copies in the US alone. Leave This Town has been certified Platinum by both the RIAA and Music Canada.

Background
Chris Daughtry announced on his Twitter that there would be 14 songs on the record, but 5 bonus tracks in different stores. Nearly 70 songs were written for Leave This Town, before the selection was narrowed down to 19. Daughtry co-wrote the songs on the album with Richard Marx, Chad Kroeger from Nickelback, Ryan Tedder from OneRepublic, Jason Wade from Lifehouse, Adam Gontier from Three Days Grace, Eric Dill from The Click Five, and Mitch Allan from SR-71 and Tommy Henriksen. On May 29, 2009, Daughtry released the album art cover. The songs written with Marx, Tedder, Gontier and Wade didn't make the standard edition of the album, but were released as bonus tracks in various markets.

Three songs from the CD ("No Surprise," "Every Time You Turn Around," and "You Don't Belong") were used to promote racing on ESPN. "You Don't Belong" resultantly entered the Billboard Hot 100 at number 95.

The title of the album comes from lyrics from the track "September".

Reception

Critical reception

Critical response to Leave This Town was mixed. At Metacritic, which assigns a normalized rating out of 100 to reviews from mainstream critics, the album has received an average score of 59, based on 10 reviews.

Commercial performance
It sold 269,000 copies in its first week in the U.S., peaking at number one. It peaked at number two in Canada, six places ahead of its predecessor. The album has sold 1,329,000 copies as of May 2, 2012.

In media
"Ghost of Me" was featured on a CSI: Miami commercial.

"No Surprise" was performed live by the band on the top 4 results show of the eighth season of American Idol on May 5, 2009.

"Tennessee Line" was performed live with Vince Gill during the 2009 CMA awards on November 11, 2009. It was also used as a music backdrop to the trailer for the TV series "Young Justice".

"Learn My Lesson" has been featured in a commercial of Fullmetal Alchemist: Brotherhood in Animax-Asia.

"Every Time You Turn Around" was featured in the video game MLB 2K10

"Supernatural" is featured in the preview of the 2010 MLB Division Series, both NL & AL on TBS.

Singles 
"No Surprise"  served as the lead single for the album. It was streamed on their official website, on the evening of May 6, 2009. The song was made available on iTunes May 5, 2009. It debuted at number fifteen on the Billboard Hot 100 the chart week of May 23, 2009. It is the band's highest debut to date on the chart, fueled by strong first week digital sales of 103,000. It has sold 1,201,000 copies in the United States by January 19, 2011.
The second single, "Life After You", was released around October 2009. It has sold 890,000 digital downloads in the United States.
The third single is "September". It was performed on the American Idol Season 9 Top 4 Results Show. It has sold 419,000 digital downloads in the United States.

Track listing

  
    
 
Unused tracks
 
"From Where You're Standing" (performed live) 
"Standing Still" (performed live) 
"When You Come Around" (performed live) 
"You're In My Hands" (performed live) 
"Back to Me" (performed live)

Personnel
Adapted credits from the album's liner notes.

Band members
 Chris Daughtry – lead vocals, third guitar
 Josh Steely – lead guitar, backing vocals
 Brian Craddock – rhythm guitar, backing vocals
 Josh Paul – bass, backing vocals
 Joey Barnes – drums, percussion, keyboards, backing vocals tracks (1–6)
 Robin Diaz – drum tracks (7–12)

Additional musicians
Howard Benson – additional keyboards and programming
Phil X – additional guitars
Michito Sanchez – additional percussion
Jamie Muhoberac – additional keyboards
Aubrey Haynie – additional fiddle
Vince Gill – backing vocals on "Tennessee Line"
Debbie Lurie – string arrangements
Mark Robertson – string contractor

Technical personnel
Howard Benson – producer
Chris Lord-Alge – mixing
Ted Jensen – mastering

Charts and certifications

Weekly charts

Year-end charts

Certifications

References

Daughtry (band) albums
RCA Records albums
2009 albums
Albums produced by Howard Benson
19 Recordings albums